"Eli's Comin" is a song written and recorded in 1967 by American singer-songwriter and pianist Laura Nyro. The song was first released in 1968 on Nyro's album, Eli and the Thirteenth Confession.

Other versions
The song was recorded by Three Dog Night in 1969, on their 1969 albums Suitable for Framing (for which see note on piano outro) and Captured Live at the Forum. Their studio version reached number 10 on the Billboard Hot 100 and number 4 in Canada's RPM Magazine charts.
Don Ellis released a version in 1969 on his album The New Don Ellis Band Goes Underground.
The Friends of Distinction released a version in 1969 on their album Grazin'.
Honey Ltd. released a version in 1969 as a single on the LHI label. 
Maynard Ferguson released a version in 1970 on his album M.F. Horn.
Affinity released a version in 1970 as a single (also included in later pressings of their self-titled album).
The 5th Dimension released a version on their 1971 album Live!!
The Nylons played the song on their 1991 album 4 On The Floor - Live In Concert.

In popular culture
"Eli's Comin'" was featured in a first season episode of the TV series Sports Night called "Eli's Coming".

References

1967 songs
1968 singles
Songs written by Laura Nyro
Laura Nyro songs
Three Dog Night songs
CBS Records singles
Columbia Records singles
Dunhill Records singles